Nonea caspica is an annual herb in the family Boraginaceae, native from Turkey to Central Asia and Pakistan.

Distribution
It is native to the following countries or regions: Afghanistan, Iran, Iraq, Kazakhstan, Kyrgyzstan, Pakistan, Russia, Tajikistan, Transcaucasia, Turkey, Turkmenistan and Uzbekistan. But it has been introduced in Krasnoyarsk and West Siberia.

References

Flora of Central Asia
Boraginoideae